"Teutonic Witch" is a single by Finnish doom metal band Reverend Bizarre. It was released in May 2007. The song reached number one on the Finnish singles chart. It also appears in III: So Long Suckers combined with "They Used Dark Forces", from the same album.

Track listing

References 

Reverend Bizarre songs
Number-one singles in Finland
2007 songs
Spinefarm Records singles